Jamie Simon Borthwick (born 23 June 1994) is an English actor who has portrayed the role of Jay Brown in the BBC soap opera EastEnders since 2006. He is also known for his role in Not Going out as The kid who Kicks Lee

Career
Borthwick has portrayed Jay Brown in EastEnders since 2006. His first appearance aired on 14 December.  His first appearance on mainstream television was as an orphan in the Celebrate Oliver! musical alongside Shane Richie and Joseph McManners. In late 2006 Borthwick had a one-off role in Not Going Out. He has also appeared in the "Life In The Underpass" episode of Gina's Laughing Gear. Borthwick won the award for Best Dramatic Performance From a Young Actor or Actress at the 2008 British Soap Awards and dedicated it to his late grandmother, who died one day prior to his win.

Personal life
Borthwick carried Kevin Mitchell's championship belt into the ring prior to a bout in July 2007. He attended Sylvia Young Theatre School until he was 16. He is a second cousin to former EastEnders co-star Charlie Winter, who played Hunter Owen. In January 2019, it was announced that he would be running the London Marathon with some of his EastEnders co-stars for a Dementia campaign in honour of Barbara Windsor.

In May 2021, Borthwick was caught speeding in his car at 52 mph on a 30 mph road in Romford, and he was subsequently given a driving ban. His lawyer appealed the ban and his ban was removed, with the lawyer stating that Borthwick is recognised whilst using public transport, and "not all of these encounters are favourable".

Awards and nominations

References

External links

 

1994 births
Actors from London
Alumni of the Sylvia Young Theatre School
English male soap opera actors
Living people